The Admiral of the South, North and West formally known as Admiral of the  Kings Southern, Northern  and Western Fleets  or Admiral of all the Fleets about England   was a senior English Navy appointment and Commander-in-Chief of the English Navy from 1360 to 1369.

History 
The naval defence of England from the end of the 13th century was divided into regional commands or 'admiralties' the Admiral of the North, the Admiral of the South and the Admiral of the West. The first royal commission as Admiral to a naval officer was granted in 1303. In 1328 the Admiralty of the South its units, formations and staff was merged with the Admiralty of the North until the end of the fourteenth Century. By 1344 the appointment of an admiral was only used as a rank at sea for a captain in charge of a fleet or fleets.

The appointment of an admiral was not regarded by the English government at the time as an honorary post subordinate to a military rank, their importance attached to their office can be confirmed by the recording of their allowances paid recorded in the Calendar of Patent Rolls. In the fourteenth Century Admirals were paid a respectable salary which was only granted because the position was viewed as substantially important. In addition the rank of admiral was only granted to men of high prestige within feudal hierarchy, most recipients of the office were usually knights but more often earls.

On 18 July 1360 King Edward III of England appointed  Sir John de Beauchamp by letters patent, formally 'Admiral of the King's Southern, Northern and Western Fleets' giving him sole command of the English Navy effectively Admiral of the Fleet  two further post holders would succeed Sir John de Beauchamp.

The Admirals duties usually consisted of assembling fleets for naval expeditions undertaken by the monarch on campaign, maintaining order and discipline and supervising the work of the Admiralty Courts for each region. On major military expeditions the Admiral would go to sea with their fleets and accompany the overall Commander-in-Chief of both sea and land forces usually the King himself but sometimes a nobleman of higher rank than the admiral. Their role was to observe and direct naval battles but not necessarily taking part in them themselves. However, from 1344 onward their role was moving from primarily an administrative one to that of a seagoing command.

In 1337 the first known record of the appointment of a "vice-admiral' was granted to a Nicholas Ususmaris, a Genoese, he was made Vice-Admiral
of the King's fleet of galleys, and all other ships of Aquitaine. However these appointments were few and far between.  There was two further instances of the appointment of Vice-Admirals to Sir Thomas Drayton as Vice-Admiral of the Northern Fleet and Sir Peter Bard Vice-Admiral of the Western Fleet both on 28 July 1338.

Special assistants were appointed to handle two important sub-divisions of the admirals powers. The first was the admiral's lieutenant, or deputy, who handled administrative and legal duties and each of these admirals had one. It would not be until the early 15th century that they would appointed on a more regular basis however they were referred to at this time as the admirals Lieutenant-General this office eventually became known as the Lieutenant of the Admiralty.

The second was the Wardens of the Coast for each region who were responsible for the direction and co-ordination of the fleet, the equipping of boats and processing payments to sailors and superintendence of the Sea Guard Militia assigned to each coastal county. From the mid fourteenth century there was a move to centralise these regional naval authorities as seen with the appointment of the Admiral of the Southern, Northern and Western fleets sometimes referred to as Admiral of the Fleet or Admiral of England and the Admiral of the North and West this tendency towards unifying regional naval authorities under one admiral eventually led to the creation of the office of the Lord-Admiral of England

The Admirals were logistically supported by the Clerk of the Kings Ships who looked after all the navy's finances whilst victualling of the navy was handled by another one of Kings Clerks.

Admirals of the South, North and West
Post holders include:           
Admirals of all the Fleets
 Admiral of all the Fleets: Sir John de Beauchamp, 18 July 1360 – 2 December 1360. (died in office).
 Admiral of all the Fleets: Sir Robert de Herle, 2 December 1360 - 7 July 1364. (died in office) 
 Admiral of all the Fleets: Sir Ralph de Spigurnell, July 1364 - 1369 (retained title for life)

See also
Admiral of the Narrow Seas
Admiral of the North
Admiral of the North and West
Admiral of the North and South
Admiral of the South
Admiral of the West
Lord High Admiral of England

References

Footnotes

Sources

 
 Mangone, Gerard J. (1997). United States Admiralty Law. Leiden, Netherlands: Martinus Nijhoff Publishers. .
St. George Tucker. Vol. (1996). Blackstone's commentaries: with notes of reference to the constitution and laws, of the federal government of the United States, and of the Commonwealth of Virginia; with an appendix to each volume, containing short tracts upon such subjects as appeared necessary to form a connected view of the laws of Virginia as a member of the federal union (Originally published: Philadelphia : William Young Birch, and Abraham Small, 1803. ed.). Union, NJ: Lawbook Exchange. .
Rodger, N.A.M. (2004). "Admirals and Officials: English Admirals 1295 to 1408". The safeguard of the sea : a naval history of Britain from 660 to 1649. New York: W.W. Norton. 
Twiss, Travers (2012). The Black Book of the Admiralty: With an Appendix. Cambridge, England. Cambridge University Press. .

S
1360 establishments in England
1369 disestablishments in England